Tired and Emotional is the debut album by Irish singer Mary Coughlan released in 1985 by East West Records, a subsidiary of Warner Music Group (at the time known as WEA).

Reception
The album sold an unexpected 100,000 copies in Ireland, partly because of a memorable appearance on The Late Late Show. It also received a B+ rating from rock critic Robert Christgau.

Track listing

Personnel
Mary Coughlan - vocals
Erik Visser - guitar, percussion
Declan Gibbons - guitar
Gerrard Coffey - guitar, executive producer
Greg 'Curly' Keranen - double bass
Micky Belton - drums
Tony Maher - accordion, synthesizer
Gerald O'Donoghue - percussion, engineer
Carl Hession - piano, synthesizer
Pat MacNamara - accordion
Johnny "Ringo" McDonagh - bones
Keith Donald, Tony Chambers - saxophone
Jimmy Higgins, Snr. - trumpet

References

1985 debut albums
Mary Coughlan (singer) albums
Warner Records albums